Lucas Chevalier (born 6 November 2001) is a French professional footballer who plays as a goalkeeper for Ligue 1 club Lille.

Club career
Chevalier is a youth academy graduate of Lille. He was third-choice goalkeeper of club behind Mike Maignan and Orestis Karnezis during their league title winning 2020–21 season. In July 2021, he joined Ligue 2 club Valenciennes on a season long loan deal. He made his professional debut for the club on 18 September 2021 in a 1–1 draw against Pau.

On 10 September 2022, Chevalier made his professional debut for his boyhood club with a strong performance against Marseille. A few weeks later, on 9 October, he stopped a penalty kick and made decisive saves in Lille 1–0 home win over Derby du Nord rivals Lens. He was praised for his performance that earned him a rating of 8/10 in La Voix du Nord and a spot in L'Équipe's Team of the Week. After the game, he told to Prime Video Sport pundit Thierry Henry that former Lille keeper Mike Maignan phoned him before the game to advise and encourage him. In January 2023, Chevalier extended his contract with Lille until June 2027.

International career
Chevalier is a former French youth international. He has appeared for under-16 and under-18 teams in friendlies.

Career statistics

Honours 
Lille

 Ligue 1: 2020–21

References

External links
 
 

2001 births
Living people
Sportspeople from Calais
Association football goalkeepers
French footballers
France youth international footballers
Ligue 1 players
Ligue 2 players
Championnat National 2 players
Championnat National 3 players
Valenciennes FC players
Footballers from Hauts-de-France